Distance is a 2015 anthology drama film directed by Xin Yukun, Tan Shijie, and Sivaroj Kongsakul and starring Chen Bolin, Jiang Wenli, Tony Yang, Paul Chun and Chayanit Chansangavej. A Chinese-Thai-Singaporean-Taiwanese co-production, the film was shown at the 52nd Golden Horse Film Festival and Awards on November 5, 2015 and was released in China by Beijing Juhe Yinglian Media on May 13, 2016 and in Taiwan on May 20, 2016. The film consists of three short segments, each of which was intended by executive producer Anthony Chen to focus on one of three types of relationship: family, friendship and love.

Plot
A conflicted manager on a business trip is intrigued by an elderly worker and investigates his life.

A young father receives a letter that brings him to a foreign land, where old emotions come unburied.

A visiting professor from overseas sets a student's heart fluttering, while having to deal with his own.

Different characters, different relationships, the same humanity; stories about the distances between us and how we live with them.

Cast
Chen Bolin
Jiang Wenli
Tony Yang
Paul Chun
Chayanit Chansangavej
Feng Li
Yeo Yann Yann

Reception
The film has grossed  at the Chinese box office.

References

External links

Chinese drama films
Thai drama films
Singaporean drama films
Taiwanese drama films
Chinese anthology films
2015 drama films
2015 films
Singaporean multilingual films
Taiwanese multilingual films
Chinese multilingual films